Roberto Regazzi (born 20 August 1956 in Bologna, Italy) is a notable contemporary violin maker and scholar who received his initiation in the craft from Otello Bignami. Regazzi lives and works in Bologna.

Biography
The debut was at an early age; when he was 14 years old started to be involved with passion in the construction of musical instruments, at that time mostly classical guitars, under the guidance of Alan Wilcox and Renato Scrollavezza in the mid 1970s.

Later, the possibility to become a home pupil of Otello Bignami was crucial for his decision to stop the studies at the Bologna University (Physics) to become a professional violin maker.

Established and well known worldwide for the high quality of his instruments, he has been president of a number of specialized organizations including the European Association of Violin and Bow Makers.

His violins are clear examples of the Italianate sound and in demand also in countries.

Just before the advent of the new millennium his production started to be inspired by Guarneri del Gesù, with the achievement of a rich and full sonority.
His work is also inspired by Giuseppe Fiorini, Ansaldo Poggi and Augusto Pollastri (modern Bolognese School).

In 2006 the Chamber of Commerce of Bologna conferred on him an honour in recognition of his work.
In 2018 the Fondazione Cologni wanted to have him in the Golden Book of the MAM (Maestro d'Arte e Mestiere), a sort of Grammy Award for handicraft activities.

Many are the performers and musicians who have bought and play or have ordered his instruments, including Boris Belkin, Franco Mezzena, Anne-Sophie Mutter, Ruggiero Ricci, Salvatore Greco, Giovanni Adamo, Uto Ughi, Franco Gulli, Anastasiya Petryshak, Sonia Slany, Riccardo Brengola, the Quartetto di Venezia, Peter Fisher and many others.

The Regazzi Library is a large and valuable collection of books, articles and documents about musical instruments, considered a unique piece in the world.

He has been on the jury of a number of contests for luthiers, including the 10th International Competition of the Violin Society of America at Carlisle, Pennsylvania (1992), the Freiburg Baden-Wurttemberg Internationaler Geigenbauwettbewerb Jacobus Stainer (1996), the 5th Baveno Violin Making Competition, the 2nd Concourse in S.M. della neve of Pisogne and the prestigious 10th (2001) and 14th (2021, as a Chairman Jury Member) Henryk Wieniawski Violin-Making Competition, the oldest event of this kind in the world.

He also made several classical concert guitars starting in the 1970s, up to the end of the 1980s, mostly made out of top selected quality Brazilian rosewood and quite special western red cedar and Italian or American spruce.

Every instrument is labelled and branded with iron from the beginning of his artistic career.

He has written books, lectured around the world and organised cultural events relating to his art and profession.

Regazzi is the first luthier from Bologna having been chosen as an official testimonial for the Craft of Traditional Musical Instrument Making at the Bologna Shanghai 2010 Expo.

In the same period he was also the creator and developer of the wiihang, a kind of prepared handpan which uses the infrared technology to be coupled with a specially adapted synthesizer.

Publications
 In occasione del 250º anniversario della morte di Antonio Stradivari per onorare la figura di Giuseppe Fiorini, Bazzano, 1987
 In remembrance of Ansaldo Poggi, Bologna, Florenus 1994
 The Complete Luthier's Library, Bologna, Florenus 1990 
 The Manuscript on Violin Making by G.A. Marchi - Bologna 1786, Bologna, Arnaldo Forni 1986

Publications - Contributions
 36 ème Congrès national de Lutherie et Archetèrie d’art. Conférences de Eric Blot & Roberto Regazzi, Montpellier - Le Corum 1994, ad ind.
 "A comprehensive investigation of mechanical and acoustic modifications in wood treated with high doses of gamma radiation for sterilization", in Radiation Effects and Defects in Solids, 171:9-10, 714-725, DOI: 10.1080/10420150.2016.1253089 http://dx.doi.org/10.1080/10420150.2016.1253089
 A Life of Artistry - Sketches of Otello Bignami violin maker in Bologna 1914–1989, with Roberto Verti, Adriano Cavicchi and Giovanna Benzi, Bologna, Florenus Edizioni, 1991
 "A new analytical approach to characterize the effect of γ-ray sterilization on wood", in Microchemical Journal 143 (2018) pp. 493–502 https://doi.org/10.1016/j.microc.2018.08.001
 "A scuola da Otello", in Jadranka Bentini and Piero Mioli (eds.), Maestri di Musica al Martini, I musicisti del Novecento che hanno fatto la storia di Bologna e del suo Conservatorio, Bologna, 2021, pp. 345–348 
 "Amati [Melchioni, Marchioni], Nicolò", in New Grove - Grove Music Online, Oxford Music Online, 2001: https://doi.org/10.1093/gmo/9781561592630.article.00738
 "Ansaldo, liutaio per missione", in Jadranka Bentini and Piero Mioli (eds.), Maestri di Musica al Martini, I musicisti del Novecento che hanno fatto la storia di Bologna e del suo Conservatorio, Bologna, 2021, pp. 341–344 
 "Ansaldo Poggi 1893-1984" in The Strad magazine, January 1985 (Obituary, p. 643)
 "Ansaldo Poggi centenary concert" in The Strad magazine, February 1994
 "Poggi, Ansaldo" in Dizionario Biografico degli Italiani - Volume 84 (2015)
 "Pollastri, Augusto", by Jaak Liivoja-Lorius and Roberto Regazzi in New Grove - Grove Music Online, Oxford Music Online: https://www.oxfordmusiconline.com/grovemusic/view/10.1093/gmo/9781561592630.001.0001/omo-9781561592630-e-0000044327, https://doi.org/10.1093/gmo/9781561592630.article.44327
 Augusto and Gaetano Pollastri, part 1, by Dmitry Gindin with the collaboration of Roberto Regazzi: https://tarisio.com/cozio-archive/cozio-carteggio/augusto-and-gaetano-pollastri-part-1
 Between Bologna and Stradivari. The European journeys of Giuseppe Fiorini, Cremona-Bologna 2011, Edizioni Novecento
 Bignami, Otello in New Grove - Grove Music Online, Oxford Music Online: https://www.oxfordmusiconline.com/grovemusic/view/10.1093/gmo/9781561592630.001.0001/omo-9781561592630-e-0000052227 ,  https://doi.org/10.1093/gmo/9781561592630.article.52227
 "Carving a pioneering path" [the life of Alvina de Ferenczy] in The Strad magazine, August 2015
 Characterisation of varnishes used in violins by pyrolysis-gas chromatography/mass spectrometry, in Rapid Commun. Mass Spectrom. 2008; 22
 Classic Violin-making in Piedmonte, Bologna, Florenus Edizioni, 1991
 "Fiorini's favourite pupil" in The Strad magazine, September, 1994
 "Giuseppe Fiorini" in Arte Liutaria, Florence, 1988, n. 11, pp. 29–32
 Gli Asteroidi, a movie by Germano Maccioni, 2016
 "I Fiorini e il Rinascimento", in Jadranka Bentini and Piero Mioli (eds.), Maestri di Musica al Martini, I musicisti del Novecento che hanno fatto la storia di Bologna e del suo Conservatorio, Bologna, 2021, pp. 333–336 
 "I Pollastri da Castiglione a S.Martino", in Jadranka Bentini and Piero Mioli (eds.), Maestri di Musica al Martini, I musicisti del Novecento che hanno fatto la storia di Bologna e del suo Conservatorio, Bologna, 2021, pp. 337–340 
 Il Settecento Liutario Bolognese, Scuola Popolare di Musica di Testaccio, Rome, 1989, Feb. 25th (lecture)
 "In Focus - Ansaldo Poggi (1933)" in The Strad magazine, January, 2020, pp. 61–63
 La Liuteria in Emilia e Romagna dalle origini ai giorni nostri, Rimini 2002. Idealibri.
 Lutherie in Bologna: Roots & Success, Roberto Regazzi with Sandro Pasqual, Bologna, Florenus Edizioni, 1998
 "Musical Instruments' Acoustics as seen from a violin maker's point of view through the ages", in: ICA 17th International Congress on Acoustics - Rome September 2–7, 2001, Rome 2001
 Mozart a Bologna (2016), a movie by Graziano Cernoia, 2016

 "Oddone, Carlo Giuseppe" in Dizionario Biografico degli Italiani - Volume 79 (2013)
 Otello Bignami Cent'anni - Centenary 1914-2014, Bologna 2014, CNA Celebration Committee
 Otello Bignami, Ricordi, 46 testimonianze nel centenario della sua nascita, Bologna, Comitato Celebrativo 2014
 Otello Bignami Liutaio in Bologna - Violinmaker in Bologna, with Wilma e William Bignami, Mariarosa Pollastri, Roberto Regazzi, Bruno Stefanini, Loretta Ghelfi and Paola Malaguti, Cremona and Bologna 1998 (Turris), 2005, 
 "Otello Bignami", in Cozio Carteggio, Tarisio December 7, 2016: https://tarisio.com/cozio-archive/cozio-carteggio/otello-bignami
 "Poggi, Ansaldo", by Jaak Liivoja-Lorius and Roberto Regazzi in New Grove - Grove Music Online, Oxford Music Online: https://www.oxfordmusiconline.com/grovemusic/view/10.1093/gmo/9781561592630.001.0001/omo-9781561592630-e-0000044326 -  https://doi.org/10.1093/gmo/9781561592630.article.44326
 "Pollastri, Augusto" in Dizionario Biografico degli Italiani - Volume 84 (2015)
 "Spirit of Diversity" in The Strad magazine, September 2014, pp. 63–66
 "The man who bought Stradivari's workshop" in The Strad magazine, September 2011, pp. 79–86
 "The pupils of the workshop" in Otello Bignami Cent'anni - Centenary 1914-2014, Bologna, Comitato Celebrativo, 2014
 The Magic of Wood, interviewed by Linda Johnston, with a.o.Rudolf Koelman, Salvatore Greco, Joaquín Palomares, etc.. Genova, Dynamic 2005, edited also with a Japanese translation. 
 The Sound of Bologna, Bolognese Violin Making between the 1800s and 1900s - Events dedicated to Raffaele Fiorini and the Violin Making Tradition of the City. Bologna, Florenus 1991 Bologna, December 7–22, 2002, Art and History Collections of Fondazione Carisbo in Bologna San Giorgio in Poggiale, with William Bignami, Gabriele Carletti, Alberto Giordano, Giancarlo Guicciardi, Sandro Pasqual, Mariarosa Pollastri, Roberto Regazzi, Duane Rosengard, Pietro Trimboli and Alessandro Urso
 "The situation of violin making in Bologna in the 18th century" in Fourth Tiverton Violin Conference, East Devon College 1989, 
 "The Tononi family" in The Cozio Carteggio, Tarisio.com, March 2015
 Tecniche basate sulla conoscenza per la classificazione di oggetti complessi, un'applicazione all'analisi di violini di interesse storico, graduation thesis by Alessandro Bugatti and Adriano Ragazzi on the identification of Bignami violins. Prof. Giovanni Guida: supervisor; Piero Mussio, Ing. Pietro Baroni, Dott. Renato Meucci, Roberto Regazzi: assistant supervisors and collaborator
 Tre Secoli di Liuteria a Bologna - Mostra-Concerto a Casa Lauro in occasione del Congresso UEL 1993 / Three Centuries of Violin-making in Bologna, Unione Europea Maestri Liutai a Archettai - Union Europäischer Geigen-und Bogenbau Meister - Union Europeenne des Maîtres Luthiers at Archetiers, Bologna 1993, UEL
 Uso di pirolisi con gas cromatografia e spettrometria di massa per lo studio delle vernici usate dagli antichi liutai, graduation thesis by Emanuela Marin, Bologna University 2007. Prof. Giuseppe Chiavari: supervisor; Roberto Regazzi: assistant supervisor
 Wood-n-Soul, a movie by Alessio Gonnella, 2015

Bibliography
 Arte Italiana per il Mondo; Centro Librario Italiano. Torino 1986; vol XI, pp. 7768–7769.
 Catalogo dell'Artigianato in Italia, Milano, 1984, Giorgio Mondadori
 Chitarra: storia, miti, immagini - Bologna, 4-15 aprile 1987 - Sala Ercole in Palazzo d'Accursio, Bologna, 1987, AICS
 Drescher Thomas; Die Geigen und Lautenmacher vom Mittelalter bis zur Gegenwart; Schneider, Tutzing 1990; p. 502.
 Gabriella Gallerani, "Liuteria. Arte e passione. Intervista a un giovane liutaio nella sua bottega" in La chitarra, storia mito e immagini, Milano, 1987, Fabbri, pp. 58–64
 Gioli, Sergio, "Un amore di violino" in Il Resto del Carlino, Oct. 6, 1990
 Heimsoeth, Bettina, "Europäischer Zusammen-Klang" (Handwerk und Europa) in Kammer Aktuell, Zeitung der Handwerskammer Düsseldorf, 19. August, 1999, nummer 16, p. 15 (interview to Regazzi)
 Gruppo Liutai e Archettai Professionisti; ALI, Associazione Liutaria Italiana. Cremona 1994, pp. 76–77
 Guida all'Artigianato Artistico nella Provincia di Bologna, Bologna, 1990
 Il suono di Bologna oggi. Gruppo Liuteria Bolognese, Bologna 2003, GLB, p. 28–29.
 Secondo Concorso Nazionale di Liuteria Città di Pisogne, catalogo Aug., 2008
 Monica Mascheroni, L'Artigianato Italiano - Ferro battuto, legno intagliato, vetri piombati, terracotta, maiolica, mosaico, pizzi, merletti, strumenti musicali, Milano 1986, Mondadori
 Silvia Montevecchi, Realizzare i sogni. Storie di donne e uomini felici, with a preface by Patrizio Roversi. Unicopli, Milano, 2002. Ref. pp. 73–83: Roberto Regazzi's intimate bio. 
 Nicolini Gualtiero, Violinmakers in Italy - From the 19th century to the present, Ozzano dell’Emilia, 2008
 Nicolini Gualtiero, Liutai italiani di ieri e di oggi, Cremona, 1991
 Christobel Kent, "Craft, science, magic" in Bologna For Connoisseurs magazine, 2013, #4 Autumn, pp. 40–47: an interview with Roberto Regazzi. 
 Il Legno Magico; Bologna-Genova 2005, Florenus & Dynamic: an interview by Linda Johnston. 
 Nicolò Corsini, "Creare e Ricreare: Intervista a Roberto Regazzi, Mº Liutaio", in Liuteria Elettronica e nuovi gesti sonori: il caso delle Ondes Martenot

Discography
 Anastasiya Petryshak: Ange Terrible, with Lorenzo Meo (piano), Sony Music Bmg Europe 2023 
 Peter Fisher [violin, conductor], with Chamber Ensemble of London: Eclogue, British Chamber Music, SOMM Recordings 2022, SOMMCD0653 
 Jonathan Mesonero [solo violin]: Trascendo, IBS Classical 2020, IBS152020 
 Eleonora Turtur [violin] with Angelo Arciglione [piano]: Mario Castelnuovo-Tedesco: Exotica (World Premiere Recording), Digressione Music 2018, 
 Peter Fisher [violin], with Margaret Fingerhut [piano]: Malcolm Arnold, Centenary Celebration, SOMM Recordings 2021, SOMMCD0640 
 Emanuele Giacopelli, 2 trios for  violin,cello and piano - 2 trios for flute, violin and cello (Trio Siciliano, violin: Silviu Dima), Udamaris 2007: UME CD011
 Carl Michael Bellman: Bellman á Íslandi, JAPIS, Reykjavik 1996,  - 
 Ludwig van Beethoven, Johannes Brahms, Beethoven-Brahms, Musicarte 2007
 Antonio Vivaldi: Violin concertos, Op. 4, "La Stravaganza" 1-6, Tactus 1996 
 Antonio Vivaldi: Violin concertos, Op. 4, "La Stravaganza" 7-12, Tactus 1996 
 Antonio Vivaldi: Trio Sonata for 2 Violins and Basso Continuo, Op. 1, 1-6, Tactus 1996 
 Antonio Vivaldi: Trio Sonata for 2 Violins and Basso Continuo, Op. 1, 7-12, Tactus 1996 
 Gian Francesco Malipiero, Complete String Quartets, 2 CDs, Dynamic 1996 
 Ottorino Respighi - Giuseppe Martucci, Piano Quintets, Ermitage 1993 
 The Magic of Wood, Dynamic & Florenus 2005, with Rudolf Koelman, Salvatore Greco, Alberto Martini, etc.,  
 Ottorino Respighi, Piano Quintets, with Patrizia Prati, Aura 1995: AUR 416-2 
 Antonio Bazzini, Sämtliche Streichquartette, 3 CDs, Dynamic 2002: CDT 418 
 Giuseppe Verdi, Giacomo Puccini, Riccardo Zandonai, Streichquartette, Dynamic 2004 
 Box-Set Quartetti Italiani Von Boccherini Bis Malipiero, 10 CDs, Dynamic CDS486 2005 
 Antonio Vivaldi, Violinkonzerte, 1996 
 Ludwig van Beethoven, Sämtliche Streichquintette, 2 CDs, Dynamic 2006: CDS484 
 Henry Purcell, Ciaccona, Gliarchiensemble CD, GAE 2008: 
 Alberto Martini, Mark Van Aken, Bicentenaire De L'étude Des Notaires Dierckx Turnhout, Sonate, PRDSM2-02 2002
 Antonio Vivaldi, (Sonaten), Tactus 
 Ottorino Respighi, Il Tramonto, Koch International 3-7215-2
 Charlie Chaplin, Dmitri Schostakovich, Sergej Rachmaninoff, Fun Time, Dynamic 1996: CDS195 
 Gian Francesco Malipiero, Luigi Dallapiccola, Hans Krása, Karl Amadeus Hartmann, Isolamenti [1938–1945]/Concert No.1, Fonit Cetra 1997: NFCD 2033 
 Antonio Vivaldi, Le Dodici Opere a Stampa (Violinkonzerte), Tactus 1996  - 
 Antonio Vivaldi, 12 Opere a Stampa (Sonaten), Tactus 
 Didier Large, Double Face, DL-Media7 1989
 Antonio Vivaldi, Konzerte für Streicher und Basso continuo, Naxos 1997 
 Giovanni Battista Viotti, Concerto No. 23; Sinfonie concertanti Nos. 1 & 2 (Aldo Sisillo), Naxos 1998 
 Antonio Vivaldi, Opera 7 - Libro Primo (Concerti 1-6), Tactus 2000 
 Antonio Vivaldi, Concerto for violin & strings in Bf; Concerto for violin & strings in Dm, Tactus 1996 
 Antonio Vivaldi, Flute Concertos Op. 10 with Marzio Conti, L’Offerta musicale di Venezia, Nuova Era 1994: 7192 
 Claude Debussy, Maurice Ravel, Akio Yashiro, Akira Miyoshi, Chikashi Tanaka and Kazuoki Fujii, Camerata 2001: 28CM-612 
 Domenico Scarlatti, Joaquín Rodrigo, Jutta Wenzlaff and Thomas Bittermann, Sound Star-Ton 1992 
 Nino Rota, La Strada, The Leopard, etc., conducted by Marzio Conti, Chandos 2003 
 Orquestra Mahatma and the Solid Strings, Nightingale of a Thousand Joys, Villagelife 1999 
 Iames Santi, 1999
 Giuseppe Martucci, Klavierquintett Op. 45, Aura 2002 
 Sonia Slany and the Solid Strings, Bubbling Under, Villagelife 2000 
 Cantos Yoruba de Cuba, KLE 2003
 I Concerti: Solo, Duo, Trio 2003
 Sonia Slany, Monochord Music, Villagelife
 Sonia Slany, Meeting Electra, Villagelife 1997 
 Orquestra Mahatma, Live Stay Cool, Babel 2005: BDV 2557 
 Luigi Boccherini, String Quartets Vol.1, Dynamic 1995: CDS 111 
 Luigi Boccherini, String Quartets Vol.2, Dynamic 1995: CDS 127 
 Luigi Boccherini, String Quartets Vol.3, Dynamic 1996 CDS 154 
 Didier Large, Jazz Guitar Solo, Adda ETM 1991
 Ludwig van Beethoven, Quartets Op. 18 n.3 & Op. 59 n.3 'Rasumovsky''', UNICEF - DC U33 / CD33 - 
 Camille Saint-Saëns, Streichquartette, Dynamic 1997: CDS 179 
 Ottorino Respighi, "Quartetto Dorico" & Quartet in D minor, Dynamic 2001 
 Ruggiero Ricci, The Legacy of Cremona, Dynamic 2001: CDS373 
 Ludwig van Beethoven, Ástor Piazzolla, Un incontro con Dora, Aikoros 2000
 Gabriel Fauré, Cuartetos con Piano, Dahiz 1999: 8-431374-000136
 Hans Krása, Gideon Klein, Viktor Ullmann, Pavel Haas, Karl Amadeus Hartmann, Forbidden, Not Forgotten: Suppressed Music from 1938-1945 (BOX SET 3 CDs), Homage 1995: 7001892 

Notes

 External links 

A movie by Alessio Gonnella sponsored by the International Wood Culture Society in 2015:, 2015, with Begum Calimli
http://www.lucabolognese.com/Roberto_Regazzi_Liutaio.htm
A fragmented interview with Roberto Regazzi, featuring some of his violins starting at min. 20:01 (2018, Euradio Nantes): https://web.archive.org/web/20180702150837/http://www.euradionantes.eu/2018/05/09/un-aveugle-en-vadrouille-a-bologne/

1956 births
Living people
Bowed string instrument makers
Businesspeople from Bologna
Italian luthiers
Italian musical instrument makers